Ceyhan is a city and a district in the Adana Province, in southern Turkey,  east of Adana. With a population of over 157,000, it is the largest district of the province, outside the city of Adana. Ceyhan is the transportation hub for Middle Eastern and Central Asian oil and natural gas. The city is situated on the Ceyhan River that flows through Çukurova plain. The Ceyhan River is dammed at Aslantas to provide flood control and irrigation for the lower river basin around Ceyhan.

Economy
Ceyhan's marine transport terminal is the Mediterranean terminus of the Baku–Tbilisi–Ceyhan pipeline (the "BTC") which brings crude oil from the landlocked Caspian Sea across Azerbaijan and Georgia, and entering Turkey in the northeast. The pipeline was completed in May 2005. The terminal contains seven storage tanks, a jetty capable of loading two tankers of up to  simultaneously, metering facilities, a waste water treatment plant and vapor incineration ("burn-off") facilities.

Ceyhan Terminal is also the destination of Kirkuk-Ceyhan Oil Pipeline.

Contemporary Life
Ceyhan is the second most developed and populated district of Adana Province after the center of Adana. The river runs through the district.

Transport
There are domestic and international flights to numerous destinations from the airport. There was a plane crash here in 1999. A Saudi bound plane carrying Hajj pilgrims crashed a few minutes after take off. There were many deaths.

Ceyhan Railway Station was opened in 1912 as part of the Berlin-Baghdad Railway. The station is currently served by two regional lines and one long-distance line. Regional lines run from Mersin to İskenderun and Mersin to İslahiye; long-distance line runs from Adana to Elazığ. There are three services daily to Adana Central Station to connect to the western destinations; Mersin, Ankara, Karaman and Kayseri.

Places of interest
The Caravanserai of Kurtkulağı - built in 1659 by Hüseyin Paşa, architect Mehmed Ağa.
Tumlu Kale or Dumlukale - another castle.
Sirkeli Höyük - built to commemorate a battle here between Hittite emperor Muvattali and the Egyptian pharaoh Rameses.

International relations

Twin towns – Sister cities
Ceyhan is twinned with:
 Sumgait, Azerbaijan

See also
Çukurova
Cilicia War
Chronology of the Turkish War of Independence
Kirkuk-Ceyhan Oil Pipeline

Footnotes

 
Çukurova
Populated places in Adana Province
Districts of Adana Province